Kray or krai may refer to:
Krai, a type of a federal subject in Russia or a type of an administrative division of the former RSFSR
KRAY-FM, a radio station
Kray twins, the London gangsters
Charlie Kray, eldest brother, born before either of the Kray twins
Kray, Rap/Hip-Hop Artist
Baron Pál Kray (1735–1804), Hungarian-Austrian General during the Napoleonic Wars
Kray, a 2010 Russian film
Essen-Kray, a borough of the German city Essen

See also
Cray (disambiguation)